The 2021–22 Southwestern Athletic Conference women's basketball season is scheduled to begin with practices in October 2021 followed by the 2021–22 NCAA Division I women's basketball season in November 2021. The conference is scheduled to begin in December 2021. This was the 41st season under the Southwestern Athletic Conference name. 

The SWAC tournament is scheduled for March 9–12, 2022 at the Bartow Arena in Birmingham, Alabama.

Pre-season

Preseason polls

SWAC Coaches' Poll

Source:

SWAC Preseason All-Conference

Preseason All-SWAC First Team

Source:

Preseason All-SWAC Second Team

Source:

Midseason watchlists
Below is a table of notable midseason watch lists.

Final watchlists
Below is a table of notable year end watch lists.

Regular season
In 30 December of 2021 Southwestern Athletic Conference update their COVID-19 protocol. If a team is unable to play due to COVID-19 related issues the match will be counted as a forfeit for the purpose of the conference standings resulting in a loss for the team that caused the cancellation and a win for the opposing team. As per NCAA policy, a COVID-19 related forfeit not change a team's official won-lost record, nor will it impact statistics or coaching records. It will only count for the purpose of the conference standings.

Records against other conferences
2021–22 records against non-conference foes as of (December 30, 2021):

Regular Season

Post Season

Record against ranked non-conference opponents
This is a list of games against ranked opponents only (rankings from the AP Poll):

Team rankings are reflective of AP poll when the game was played, not current or final ranking

† denotes game was played on neutral site

Post season

SWAC tournament

Jackson State won the conference tournament from March 9–12, 2022, at the Bartow Arena, Birmingham, AL. The top eight teams from the conference regular season play at the tournament. Teams were seeded by conference record, with ties broken by with a tie–breaker system to seed teams with identical conference records.  

Reference:

NCAA tournament

One team from the conference were selected to participate: Jackson State.

National Invitation Tournament 
Three conferences (Big Ten, Big 12, SWAC) rejected their bids to participate WNIT, so SWAC team didn't participate this year WNIT.

Awards and honors

Players of the Week 
Throughout the conference regular season, the SWAC offices named one or two players of the week each week.

Totals per School

WNBA Draft 

The SWAC had one player selected in the WNBA Draft. Ameshya Williams-Holliday from Jackson State selected by Indiana Fever on the 3rd round 25th overall pick. Williams-Holliday was the first player from HBCU, who selected on the WNBA draft since 2002.

References